Değirmenönü can refer to:

 Değirmenönü, Alaca
 Değirmenönü, Elâzığ
 Değirmenönü, Kızılcahamam